Neal Calvin Peterson is a musician and artist.

Biography 

Peterson was raised in Minot, North Dakota.  From 1999 to 2003, he played bass guitar in Curious Yello before performing and releasing music independently. Peterson is based in Minneapolis, Minnesota.

Discography

Infinite Religions 
 2015: Harmony
 2014: Mirrors
 2014: Duality

Neal Peterson 
 2011: The Persistence of Tides
 2009: Chaos Theory, Explained (EP)
 2007: Riot in Luxury
 2003: Songs for the Whiskey Convention (Demos)

Curious Yello 
 2009: XYZ: Rarities
 2001: Wish

External links
 nealcalvinpeterson.com

References

Living people
Musicians from Minneapolis
People from Bottineau County, North Dakota
Year of birth missing (living people)

nl:Eric Peterson (acteur)